Strophurus robinsoni is a species of gecko, a lizard in the family Diplodactylidae. The species is endemic to Australia.

Etymology
The specific name, robinsoni, is in honor of Australian herpetologist David Robinson.

Geographic range
In Australia, S. robinsoni is found in Northern Territory and Western Australia.

Habitat
The preferred habitats of S. robinsoni are grassland and rocky areas.

Reproduction
S. robinsoni is oviparous.

References

Further reading
Cogger HG (2014). Reptiles and Amphibians of Australia, Seventh Edition. Clayton, Victoria, Australia: CSIRO Publishing. xxx + 1,033 pp. .
Laver RJ, Nielsen SV, Rosauer DF, Oliver PM (2017). "Trans-biome diversity in Australian grass-specialist lizards (Diplodactylidae: Strophurus)". Molecular Phylogenetics and Evolution 115: 62–70.
Rösler H (2000). "Kommentierte Liste der rezent, subrezent und fossil bekannten Geckotaxa (Reptilia: Gekkonomorpha)". Gekkota 2: 28–153. (Strophurus robinsoni, new combination, p. 115). (in German).
Smith LA (1995). "A new Diplodactylus, subgenus Strophurus (Lacertilia: Gekkonidae) from northern Australia". Records of the Western Australian Museum 17 (3): 351–353. (Diplodactylus robinsoni, new species).
Wilson, Steve; Swan, Gerry (2013). A Complete Guide to Reptiles of Australia, Fourth Edition. Sydney: New Holland Publishers. 522 pp. .

Strophurus
Geckos of Australia
Reptiles described in 1995
Taxa named by Lawrence Alec Smith